Dark Age is a 1987 Australian horror adventure film directed by Arch Nicholson, produced by Antony I. Ginnane and starring John Jarratt.

Plot
Steve Harris (John Jarratt) is a ranger who has been assigned to deal with a massive saltwater crocodile that's been attacking and killing people in the Northern Territory. He finds himself at odds with the local Aboriginal community, who believe the crocodile should be preserved since it contains the spirit of their past. Steve must develop a plan to respect the wishes of the Aborigines and also protect the residents threatened by the crocodile.

Cast
John Jarratt as Steve Harris
Nikki Coghill as Cathy Pope
Max Phipps as John Besser
Burnam Burnam as Oondabund
David Gulpilil as Adjaral
Ray Meagher as Rex Garret
Jeff Ashby as Mac Wilson
Paul Bertram as Jackson

Production
The film was part of a two-picture deal between executive producer Antony I. Ginnane and Hollywood studio RKO which also included The Lighthorsemen. Shooting took place five weeks in Cairns and one week in Alice Springs, starting 22 April 1986.

The plot shares many similarities to Jaws and contains homage shots such as the shot involving a shooting star.

Release
The movie was never seen in Australia theatrically and took a long time to be seen on DVD.

Reception
Dennis Schwartz of Ozus' World Movie Reviews gave a positive review, calling the film "well-produced and acted, and an intelligent environmental adventure film results."

Quentin Tarantino spoke enthusiastically of the film in the documentary Not Quite Hollywood: The Wild, Untold Story of Ozploitation!, commenting "You could re-release Dark Age in 2,000 screenings and people would go see it." In 2009, Tarantino hosted a screening for it in Sydney.

Filmink later said "The phenomenal box office success of Jaws meant producers inevitably looked towards Australia’s deadly fauna as a source of inspiration... In hindsight, it’s actually weird that more films about killer animals weren’t made in the 10BA era."

See also
 List of killer crocodile films

References

External links
 
 Dark Age at Oz Movies
Dark Age at Letterbox DVD
Review of film at Starburst
Review of film at The Guardian

1987 films
1987 horror films
Adventure horror films
Films set in the Northern Territory
Films shot in the Northern Territory
Films shot in Queensland
Films about crocodilians
Australian adventure films
Australian natural horror films
1980s English-language films
Films directed by Arch Nicholson
1980s Australian films